Zahedshir (also Romanized as Zāhedshīr and Zāhed Shīr; also known as Deh-e Zāhed, Deh Zāhid, and Zāhedshīn) is a village in Dehpir Rural District, in the Central District of Khorramabad County, Lorestan Province, Iran. At the 2006 census, its population was 339, in 79 families.

References 

Towns and villages in Khorramabad County